Leucauge dromedaria, the humped silver orb spider, is one of the long-jawed orb weaver spiders. 
A medium to large sized orb weaving spider, with a body length up to 15 mm long (female). Male to 6 mm. This species has a second pair of "humps" on the abdomen. Found in Australia, some south Pacific Islands and New Zealand.

References

dromedaria
Spiders described in 1842
Spiders of Australia
Spiders of New Zealand